Sergey Konstantinovich Zaryanko (Russian: Сергей Константинович Зарянко; 6 October 1818, Lyady – 1 January 1870, Moscow) was a Russian portrait painter and art teacher of Belarusian ancestry.

Biography 
He was the son of a serf on the estate of the Lubomirski family. After his father received his freedom, they moved to Saint Petersburg and entered the employ of Alexander Golitsyn, who would later be a government minister. In 1834, thanks to a recommendation from Alexey Venetsianov, he was able to begin auditing classes at the Imperial Academy of Arts.

At first, he painted interiors rather than portraits and studied landscape painting with Maxim Vorobiev. In 1836, he was awarded a silver medal. Two years later, he received the title of "Artist" and was awarded another silver medal in 1841.

In 1849, his paintings of General Pyotr Karlovich Lomnovsky (1798-1860) and the opera singer, Osip Petrov, established his reputation in that field. The following year, his portrait of Fyodor Tolstoy earned him the title of "Professor".

In 1856, on the recommendation of Feodor Pryanishnikov, he began working at the Moscow School of Painting, Sculpture and Architecture as a senior Professor of painting and had many notable students there; including Vasily Perov, Illarion Pryanishnikov and Vasili Pukirev. He painted little during the 1860s, focusing instead on teaching. Having suffered from eyestrain for many years, it is believed that he may have lost his sight in one eye. He is said to have died suddenly.

Works

References

Further reading 
 Alexander Muratov, Сергей Константинович Зарянко художник, педагог, теоретик искусства (Zaryanko: Painter, teacher and art theoretician) Dmitri Bulanin, 2003 
 Alexander Muratov, Сергей Зарянко, "Masters of Art" series, Белый город, 2004

External links 

1818 births
1871 deaths
People from Dubrowna District
People from Orshansky Uyezd
Artists from the Russian Empire
Belarusian painters
19th-century painters from the Russian Empire
Russian male painters
Russian portrait painters
19th-century male artists from the Russian Empire
Academic staff of the Moscow School of Painting, Sculpture and Architecture